Zanda Bikše is a Latvian curler.

She was lead for the Latvian team at the 2010 Ford World Women's Curling Championship in Swift Current, Canada. She also represented Latvia at the 2013 World Women's Curling Championship at home in Riga, Latvia, finishing in last place with a 1–10 record.

References

External links
 

Latvian female curlers
Living people
1970 births
Sportspeople from Riga
21st-century Latvian women